Sacheon Airport is an airport in Sacheon, South Korea . It also serves the city of Jinju. The airport passenger service began in 1977 after years of delays. The airport has a small single storey terminal building for domestic flights. In 2011, 143,483 passengers utilized the airport. Because Sacehon Airport is sharing with military, taking photograph or video of apron, runway and military facility is strictly prohibited.

Airlines and destinations

Sacheon is a domestic airport with service from one airline. Direct flights are from Jeju and Seoul-Gimpo.

Transportation

Besides private cars and taxi, the airport is connected by buses(No.75 and No.95) to Jinju and Sacheon. The airport is accessed via Gonghangdero Expressway.

Tenants

 Hi Air

The airport is also the home of Korea Aerospace Industries, which manufactures military aircraft, and satellites. The T-50 trainers used by the Sacheon Air Base are manufactured by the company on the north side of the airport.

Air Base

Korean War
During the Korean War the USAF designated the base K-4.

The Base was used as part of the USAF's Bout One project to train South Korean pilots to fly the F-51 in 1950.

The ROKAF 10th Fighter Wing was formed at the base in 1951.

Postwar
The Republic of Korea Air Force operates from Sacheon using trainers and test aircraft at Jinju, which is home to the Republic of Korea Air Force Education and Training Command since 1998. Hangars for the trainers are found on the north and south sides of the airport.

 3rd Flying Training Wing
 213 Flight Training Squadron
 215 Flight Training Squadron
 217 Flight Training Squadron
 236 Flight Training Squadron
 52 Test Evaluation Group
 281 Test Evaluation Squadron
 Basic Military Training Wing
 Air Force Aviation Science High School
 Air Force Technical School

On 13 November 2003 a KAI KT-1 crashed shortly after takeoff from the base, the instructor ejected safely while the trainee was killed.

See also
 KAI Aerospace Museum

References

External links
  (in English)

Airports in South Korea
Transport in South Gyeongsang Province
Korean War air bases
Airports established in 1969
1969 establishments in South Korea
20th-century architecture in South Korea